Charles Edward Brooke School was a school in Camberwell, London, England.

History
The school was first established as St Gabriel's College in 1900. During the First World War, the building was requisitioned by the War Office to create the 1st London General Hospital, a facility for the Royal Army Medical Corps to treat military casualties. After the war it became the Kennington Boys School and later became Charles Edward Brooke Girls' School, named after the "well-known Anglo-Catholic figure" and Vicar of St John the Divine, Kennington. After the school closed in 2012, part of the site was converted for residential use as St Gabriel's Manor.

References 

Secondary schools in the London Borough of Southwark
1900 establishments